James Lontayao is an American actor, comedian and former VJ for Myx TV.

Biography
James Lontayao was born on October 13, in San Francisco, California. He attended Junipero Serra High School in San Mateo and received his training from Foothill Theatre Conservatory. He had also received improv training from Bay Area Theatre Sports and Groundlings and currently trains at the Beverly Hills Playhouse.

Career
Lontayao launched his acting career in 2000. He has worked with numerous Bay Area theatre companies, such as Asian American Theater Company and Bindlestiff Studios. His stage credits include Sleeper, Banyan and Walls. And in 2006, he had been selected as a VJ for Myx TV. From that point on, he had hosted a pop music oriented show on the TV channel, called Loveable until 2009. Lontayao starred in many short films, including Pleasant Company, Double Features, and Cereal Monogamy, an official selection at the 2007 VC Film Festival. In 2008, Lontayao took on the leading role of Thomas Yang in an offbeat romantic comedy feature film, The Red Door. Besides his TV and film career, Lontayao had also acted on an internet comedy that explores love, sex and relationship, called Lexationships with Marc and James. The success of the show has brought his character, James Spano, to college campuses, such as San Francisco State University, for live performances. Additionally, he had played the role of Zach, on an online sci-fi mini-series, Eve, Beauty and the Blade. In the Summer of 2008, Lontayao had transferred out of Loveable and became a co-host of My Myx, reuniting with longtime onscreen friend and nemesis Olivia Speranza. Continuing his act on stage, Lontayao was featured in an Asian American modern-day comedy, Ching Chong Chinaman. Not shy from the spotlight, he can be found as a standup comic at different events and venues, such as the Asian Heritage Street Celebration, and many other fundraising benefits.

Filmography

Movies

References

External links
 MYX VJ Profile
 Lexationship with Marc and James
 James Lontayao on Myspace

American male film actors
American male actors of Filipino descent
Living people
Year of birth missing (living people)